Han Yucheng (born 16 December 1978 in Liaoning) is a Chinese race walker. He competed at the 20 km race walk event at the 2004 Summer Olympics.

Achievements

References

1978 births
Living people
Athletes (track and field) at the 2004 Summer Olympics
Athletes (track and field) at the 2016 Summer Olympics
Chinese male racewalkers
Olympic athletes of China
Athletes from Liaoning
Asian Games medalists in athletics (track and field)
Athletes (track and field) at the 2006 Asian Games
Asian Games gold medalists for China
Medalists at the 2006 Asian Games